Deh-e Kadkhoda Shah Jan Bamari (also Romanized as Deh-e Kadkhodā Shāh Jān Bāmari) is a village in Jahanabad Rural District, in the Central District of Hirmand County, Sistan and Baluchestan Province, Iran. At the 2006 census, its population was 203, in 37 families.

References 

Populated places in Hirmand County